Bogdanovka may refer to:
 Bogdanovka, a World War II concentration camp set up by Romanians occupation troops in south-western Ukraine
 Norashen, Lori, Armenia, formerly Bogdanovka
 Ninotsminda, a village in southern Georgia in the Caucasus, formerly Bogdanovka

See also
Bohdanivka (disambiguation)